Journal of Personality Disorders is a bimonthly peer-reviewed psychology journal covering the study of personality disorders. It was established in 1986 and is published by Guilford Press on behalf of the International Society for the Study of Personality Disorders, of which it is the official journal. The editors-in-chief are Robert F. Krueger (University of Minnesota) and John M. Oldham (Baylor College of Medicine). According to the Journal Citation Reports, the journal has a 2016 impact factor of 3.158.

References

External links

Personality journals
Guilford Press academic journals
Publications established in 1986
English-language journals
Bimonthly journals